The 1984 Asian Judo Championships were held at Kuwait City, Kuwait in April.

Medal overview

Men's events

Medals table

References
Judo Channel by Token Corporation

External links
 Judo Union of Asia

Asian Championships
Asian Judo Championships
Judo
Judo
20th century in Kuwait City
Sport in Kuwait City
Judo competitions in Kuwait